Harold Vermilyea (October 10, 1889 – January 7, 1958) was an American actor who had a long and prolific career on Broadway, performing in 32 plays over the course of his career. He made notable appearances in several films of the post-war era, particularly film noirs, and ended his career moving into television.

Life and career 
Vermilyea was born October 10, 1889 in Manhattan. He made his first stage appearance in 1914 in "The Lion and the Mouse." Subsequent appearances included "It Pays to Advertise" (1914-1915) and a revival of "Get-Rich-Quick Wallingford" (1917), after which he served with the Army Ambulance Service in France during the First World War.

After WWI came to a close, Vermilyea returned to the Broadway stage and performed in twenty-nine further plays. These were: "A Tailor-Made Man" (1917-1918), "Hobohemia" (1919), "Pagans" (1921), "Captain Applejack" (1921-1922), "The Alarm Clock" (1923-1924), "The Lady Killer" (1924), "The Haunted House" (1924), "The Youngest" (1924-1925), "The Enemy" (1925-1926), "Loose Ankles" (1926-1927), "Los Angeles" (1927-1928), "Killers" (1928), "Anna" (1928), "A Man With Red Hair" (1928), "Midnight" (1930-1931), "We Are No Longer Children" (1932), "Bad Manners" (1933), "The Pure in Heart" (1934), "Boy Meets Girl" (1935-1937), "Fulton of Oak Falls" (1937), "Madame Bovary" (1937), "If I Were You" (1938), "Gloriana" (1938), "Gabrielle" (1941), "Sun-Up" (presumably a revival of the Lula Vollmer play; date unknown), "The Acquittal" (presumably a revival of the Rita Weiman play; date unknown), "Jacobowsky and the Colonel" (1944-1945),  "Deep Are the Roots" (1945-1946), and "Deadfall" (1955).

Vermilyea had substantial roles in 1930s radio, supporting Maude Adams in a series and playing a leading role on the Rudy Vallée Show. During the World War II years, he served as Director of the American Theatre Wing's Victory Players.

Vermilyea devoted his time in the post-war era to motion pictures and then to television. Ultimately, he died of an apparent heart attack at his apartment in Manhattan on January 8, 1958.

Selected filmography

Film 

 The Jungle (1914) - Undetermined
 Pride and the Devil (1917) - Undetermined
 The Law That Failed (1917) - Jack Thorpe
 O.S.S. (1946) - Amadeus Brink
 Gentleman's Agreement (1947) - Lou Jordan
 The Miracle of the Bells (1948) - Orloff
 The Big Clock (1948) - Don Klausmeyer
 The Sainted Sisters (1948) - Lederer
 The Emperor Waltz (1948) - Chamberlain
 Beyond Glory (1948) - Raymond Denmore, Sr.
 Sorry, Wrong Number (1948) - Chamberlain
 California's Golden Beginning [short] (1948)
 Alias Nick Beal (1949) - Chief Justice (uncredited)
 Manhandled (1949) - Dr. Redman
 Chicago Deadline (1949) - Jack Anstruder
 Edge of Doom (1950) - Father Kirkman
 Born to Be Bad (1950) - John Caine
 Katie Did It (1950) - Merill T. Grumby
 Finders Keepers (1952) - Mr. Fitzpatrick

Television 

 Danger
 Man Against Crime
 Studio One
 The Philco Playhouse

References

1889 births
1958 deaths
American male stage actors
American male television actors